The Legend of Robin Hood was a 1975 BBC television serial that told the story of the life of Robin Hood.

Plot
Robin has been raised as the son of John Hood, a groundskeeper, but learns that he is in fact the long lost son of the Earl of Huntingdon. He comes into conflict with a plot to replace King Richard I by his brother Prince John involving the Sheriff of Nottingham and Sir Guy of Gisbourne.

Broadcast
The serial was broadcast in the Sunday tea time slot.

Cast
Martin Potter as Robin Hood
Diane Keen as Lady Marion
John Abineri as Sir Kenneth Neston
William Marlowe as Sir Guy of Gisbourne
Paul Darrow as Sheriff of Nottingham
Michael-John Jackson as Richard I
David Dixon as Prince John

External links

1970s British drama television series
BBC television dramas
Robin Hood television series
Period television series
1975 British television series debuts
1975 British television series endings
1970s British television miniseries
British adventure television series
English-language television shows
Cultural depictions of Eleanor of Aquitaine
Films scored by Stanley Myers